Vímara Peres (died in Galicia, 873) was a ninth-century nobleman  who served as the first Count of Portugal.

Life

Family 
His father, Pedro Theón (d. after 867), sometimes called Pedro Theón of Pravia, and possibly the son of Bermudo I of Asturias, was a member of the Curia Regis of King Alfonso III and appears in January 867 confirming a royal charter jointly with other nobles, including Count Rodrigo of Castile.  Pedro was actively involved in the Reconquista and was also responsible for ousting and defeating the Vikings when they invaded Galicia in 858. Besides Vímara, Pedro was also the father of Hermenegildo Pérez. The old Christian version of ‘Vímara’ is believed to be derived from ‘Weimar’  a name from any of several places called Weimar in Hesse and Thuringia, from Old High German wīh "holy" and mari "standing water". Although old-fashioned, it is still used in Portugal today as Guímaro.

Count 
Vímara was a vassal of the King of Asturias, Alfonso III, and was sent to reconquer and secure from the Moors (Arabs and Berbers who had invaded Visigothic Hispania), in the west coastal fringe of Gallaecia, the area from the Minho River to the Douro River, including the city of Portus Cale, later Porto and Gaia, from where the name of Portugal emerged.

The Kingdom of Asturias was divided internally into several counties or royal provinces. Portus Cale was one of these Asturian counties. In 868, Vímara Peres was named Count of Portugal by King Alfonso III after the reconquest of the region north of the Douro river.  Later Portuguese historians viewed this event as the earliest milestone in the history of the state of Portugal, although Portugal did not achieve independence until the 12th century.

He was able to expel the Moors and founded a fortified town under his own name Vimaranis (of Vimar) which later became Guimaranis, present day Guimarães (the Portuguese call it "The Cradle City").  Vímara Peres died in 873 in the territory of A Coruña.

Issue 
Although the identity of his wife is not recorded in any contemporary charters, her name could have been Trudildi. If that was the case, Vímara would have been the father of:
 Audivia Vimaranes who was married to Count Gutierre Aloítez.

Despite the lack of documentary proof, most historians agree that he was the father of:
 Lucídio Vimaranes (Lucídio, son of Vímara), who succeeded Vímara as the governor of the county.

Notes

References

Bibliography

External links 

9th-century births
873 deaths
Counts of Portugal
County of Portugal
History of Porto
Medieval Portugal
People of the Reconquista
9th-century counts of Portugal (Asturias-León)
9th-century Visigothic people